Lucie Hradecká and Andreja Klepač were the defending champions but Hradecká chose not to participate. Klepač partnered Kirsten Flipkens, but lost in the quarterfinals to Ekaterine Gorgodze and Ankita Raina.

Gorgodze and Raina went on to win the title, defeating Aliona Bolsova and Kaja Juvan in the final, 6–4, 3–6, [10–6].

Seeds

Draw

Draw

References
Main Draw

Al Habtoor Tennis Challenge - Doubles
2020 Doubles
2020 in Emirati tennis